Worthington Miner (November 13, 1900 – December 11, 1982) was an American film producer, screenwriter, actor and director. He was married to actress Frances Fuller, with whom he had three children, including producer/director Peter Miner. He was the paternal grandfather of actress Rachel Miner. 

Prior to his work in television, Miner - known as 'Tony' - directed more than 30 plays in about 10 years, starting with Up Pops the Devil in 1929 and including Reunion in Vienna, starring Alfred Lunt and Lynn Fontanne; Both Your Houses, a Pulitzer Prize-winning play by Maxwell Anderson; On Your Toes, the Ray Bolger musical; Jane Eyre (starring Katharine Hepburn), and For Love or Money.

In 1939, after more than 10 years in the theater, Mr. Miner publicly criticized it as "highly undemocratic". At a Theatre Guild panel discussion in Williamstown, Massachusetts, he said: "When we speak of the theater, we speak of one city - New York. Yet even within the confines of that one city, the theater isn't democratic. It is a Park Avenue nightclub, a luxury for a selective few with the price of admission. It is for the rich in the richest city of this country, and I believe this situation is deplored by every author, actor and manager in the business."

At CBS Television, he created and produced Studio One (also serving as writer and director for numerous episodes); the television version of The Goldbergs; Mr. I Magination, a children's show, and The Toast of the Town, casting Ed Sullivan as master of ceremonies. He also produced The Play of the Week; Playhouse 90 and Kaiser Aluminum Hour. Miner realized that television could not 'be made to fit into preconceived patterns of motion pictures, theater or radio. Television offers, instead, a superlative opportunity to absorb every type of experiment in all other entertainment media,' he said, adding that 'there is no limit to the scope of its coverage.'

Miner died on December 11, 1982, in New York Hospital, aged 82.

Selected filmography as a producer
 The Fool Killer
 The Pawnbroker

Television
 The Iceman Cometh
 Frontier
 Medic
 Studio One

Selected filmography as an actor
 They Might Be Giants

References

External links
 
 
 Studio One production files, 1948–1955, held by the Billy Rose Theatre Division, New York Public Library for the Performing Arts
 Miner, Worthington U.S. Producer Director Museum of Broadcast Communications 
 
  (archive)

1900 births
1982 deaths
Male actors from Buffalo, New York
American male film actors
Film producers from New York (state)
American male stage actors
American male television actors
20th-century American male actors
20th-century American businesspeople